Boyington is a surname. Notable people with the surname include:

William W. Boyington (1818–1898), U.S. architect
Pappy Boyington (1912–1988), U.S. fighter pilot of World War II
Jessica Boyington (born 1985), U.S. beauty queen

See also
Boynton (disambiguation)